Costaconvexa polygrammata, the many-lined moth, is a moth of the family Geometridae. The species was first described by Moritz Balthasar Borkhausen in 1794. It is found from Europe to North Africa.

The wingspan is about 26 mm. There are three generations per year with adults on wing from the end of March to April, in June and July and in August and September.

The larvae feed on Galium species, primarily G. saxatile. Larvae can be found from April to October. It overwinters as a pupa.

External links
 
Many-lined moth at UKMoths
Fauna Europaea
Lepidoptera of Belgium
Lepiforum e.V.

Xanthorhoini
Moths described in 1794
Moths of Africa
Moths of Europe
Moths of Asia
Taxa named by Moritz Balthasar Borkhausen